Low Rock is a low rock surrounded by foul ground, lying  southwest of Stranger Point, the southern extremity of King George Island, in the South Shetland Islands, Antarctica. An unnamed rock in essentially this position appears on a chart by David Ferguson, a Scottish geologist aboard the whaler Hanka, in these waters in 1913–14. Low Rock was more accurately charted by Discovery Investigations personnel on the Discovery II in 1935 and 1937.

See also
 List of Antarctic and subantarctic islands

References

Rock formations of King George Island (South Shetland Islands)